Carlo Massullo (born 13 August 1957) is an Italian modern pentathlete and Olympic champion.

He participated on the Italian team which won a gold medal at the 1984 Summer Olympics in Los Angeles, and he also won an individual bronze medal.

At the 1988 Summer Olympics in Seoul he won an individual silver medal and a team silver medal. He received a bronze team medal in 1992

References

1957 births
Living people
Italian male modern pentathletes
Olympic modern pentathletes of Italy
Modern pentathletes at the 1984 Summer Olympics
Modern pentathletes at the 1988 Summer Olympics
Modern pentathletes at the 1992 Summer Olympics
Olympic gold medalists for Italy
Olympic silver medalists for Italy
Olympic bronze medalists for Italy
Olympic medalists in modern pentathlon
World Modern Pentathlon Championships medalists
Medalists at the 1992 Summer Olympics
Medalists at the 1988 Summer Olympics
Medalists at the 1984 Summer Olympics
20th-century Italian people